The Saint Mary's Huskies women's ice hockey program represents Saint Mary's University in Halifax, Nova Scotia, Canada.

History

Season-by-season Record 
{| class="wikitable"
|-
| style="background:#fea;"|Won Championship
| style="background:#dfd;"|<small>Lost Championship</small>
| style="background:#d0e7ff;"|Conference Champions
| style="background:#fbb;"|League Leader
|}

Season team scoring champion

All-time scoring leaders

International
Breanna Lanceleve : 2015 Winter Universiade

Awards and honors
Academic All-Canadian
Kori Cheverie: 2006-07 CIS Academic All-Canadian
Shae Demale: 2018-19 USports Academic All-Canadian

AUS honours
Ellen Laurence, 2019-20 AUS Rookie of the Year
AUS Community Service Award
Kori Cheverie: 2006-07 AUS Student-Athlete Community Service Award, nominee CIS Marion Hilliard Award
Kori Cheverie: 2007-08 AUS Student-Athlete Community Service Award, nominee CIS Marion Hilliard Award
Kori Cheverie: 2008-09 AUS Student-Athlete Community Service Award, nominee CIS Marion Hilliard Award
Beatrice Harrietha: 2016-17 AUS Student-Athlete Community Service Award, nominee CIS Marion Hilliard Award
Beatrice Harrietha: 2017-18 AUS Student-Athlete Community Service Award, nominee CIS Marion Hilliard Award
AUS Most Valuable Player
2000-01, Tasha Noble
2001-02, Tasha Noble
2002-03, Kerrie Boyle
2003-04, Lindsay Taylor
2004-05, Lindsay Taylor
2005-06, Courtney Schriver
AUS Rookie of the Year
2002-03: Lindsay Taylor
2004-05: Courtney Schriver
2012-13: Sienna Cooke
2013-14: Breanne Lanceleve
2015-16: Rebecca Clark
2019-20: Ellen Laurence

AUS Most Sportsmanlike Player
2006-07, Zoe Launcelott
2007-08, Zoe Launcelott
2008-09, Zoe Launcelott
2017-18, Breanna Lanceleve

AUS Coach of the Year
2001-02: Lisa MacDonald
2002-03: Lisa MacDonald
2015-16: Chris Larade
2016-17: Chris Larade
2019-20: Chris Larade

AUS All-StarsFirst TeamKori Cheverie: 2006-07 AUS First Team All-Star
Kori Cheverie: 2007-08 AUS First Team All-Star
Kori Cheverie: 2009-10 AUS First Team All-Star
Kiana Wilkinson, 2019-20 AUS First Team All-StarSecond Team'''
Shae Demale, 2018-19 AUS Second Team All-Star
2016-17 AUS Second Team All-Stars: Rebecca Clark
2016-17 AUS Second Team All-Stars: Caitlyn Manning

AUS All-Rookie
2018-19 AUS All-Rookie Team: Caleigh Meraw, Defense
2018-19 AUS All-Rookie Team: Shae Demale, Forward

Team awards
Kori Cheverie: 2006-07 Saint Mary's Female Athlete of the Year
Kori Cheverie: 2007-08 Saint Mary's Female Athlete of the Year
Kori Cheverie: 2006-07 Most Valuable Player for St. Mary's women's hockey
Kori Cheverie: 2007-08 Most Valuable Player for St. Mary's women's hockey
Kori Cheverie: 2008-09 Most Valuable Player for St. Mary's women's hockey
Kiana Wilkinson: 2019-20 Most Valuable Player for St. Mary's women's hockey

U Sports Awards
Lisa MacDonald, 2002-03 CIS SPORTS Coach of the Year (co-recipient)
Chris Larade, 2015-16 U SPORTS Coach of the Year
Chris Larade, 2016-17 U SPORTS Coach of the Year

U Sports All-Rookie Team
Sienna Cooke: 2012-13 USports All-Rookie Team
Rebecca Clark: 2015-16 U Sports All-Rookie Team

U Sports Rookie of the Year
Lindsay Taylor, 2002-03 U SPORTS Rookie of the Year
Courtney Schriver, 2004-05 U SPORTS Rookie of the Year

U Sports All-Canadians
Breanna Lanceleve, 2015-16 U Sports Second Team All-Canadian 
Breanna Lanceleve, 2017-18 U Sports Second Team All-Canadian
Kiana Wilkinson, 2019-20 U Sports Second Team All-Canadian

USports nationals
Caitlyn Schell: Player of the Game, Huskies vs. Western Mustangs (March 18, 2016)

University Awards
Kiana Wilkinson, Saint Mary's Female Athlete of the Year (2020)
Shae Demale, Saint Mary's Athletics President's Award (2020)
Ellen Lawrence, Saint Mary's Female Athletics Rookie of the Year (2020)

Huskies in professional hockey

References 

Sport in Halifax, Nova Scotia
U Sports women's ice hockey teams
Ice hockey teams in Nova Scotia
Women in Nova Scotia